The Zeletin is a right tributary of the river Bâsca Chiojdului in Romania. It discharges into the Bâsca Chiojdului near the village Zeletin.

References

Rivers of Romania
Rivers of Prahova County
Rivers of Buzău County